Charles Bertrand (born February 5, 1991) is a French ice hockey player who is currently playing for ERC Ingolstadt in the Deutsche Eishockey Liga (DEL)

Playing career
Bertrand made his professional debut in Finland appearing in the SM-liiga for Lukko during the 2010–11 SM-liiga season.

Bertrand joined Fribourg Gottéron on November 29, 2018, as their fifth import player on a one-year deal. He dressed up in 21 regular season games with the team, putting up 10 points and failed to help Fribourg make the playoffs. Fribourg released Bertrand at the end of the relegation round.

International play
Bertrand joined the French national team at the 2019 IIHF World Championship and got relegated to Division I A for the 2020 edition.

Awards and honours

References

External links

1991 births
Living people
French expatriate sportspeople in Finland
Ässät players
ERC Ingolstadt players
Färjestad BK players
French ice hockey forwards
HC Fribourg-Gottéron players
Hokki players
Lukko players
Oulun Kärpät players
HC Sibir Novosibirsk players
Ice hockey people from Paris
HC TPS players
Vaasan Sport players
Tappara players